Ryan Junee is an Australian-American entrepreneur. He is the founder of Parsable and is based in San Francisco.

Early career
In 2002, Junee graduated from the University of Sydney in Australia with degrees in computer engineering and commerce. After graduating, Junee worked at Telstra, but left when one of his friends raised money for a startup, Sensory Networks. Junee was the first non-founding employee at Sensory Networks, and was with the company as it grew from 5 employees to 70.

In 2003, he was accepted into the Electrical Engineering PhD program at Stanford University and moved to Palo Alto, California. After observing the entrepreneurial energy in Silicon Valley, he left Stanford once he obtained his Master's degree. He resumed working at Sensory Networks as Director of Strategic Partnerships in their Palo Alto office.

Entrepreneurial career
In October 2007, Junee left Sensory Networks to co-found his own company, Omnisio, with Julian Frumar and Simon Ratner. Junee was the co-founder and CEO of Omnisio, a service that made online video more interactive and social, allowing users to add annotations to videos, tag people and highlights, and synchronize videos with PowerPoint presentations. To much acclaim, Omnisio is most famous for the concept of banner advertising units on YouTube videos. The company received early-stage funding from Y Combinator and Chris Sacca.

In July 2008, less than a year after the company was founded, Google acquired Omnisio for an undisclosed amount (TechCrunch reported that the amount was in the range of $15 million). As part of the deal, Junee became Product Manager at YouTube. While at YouTube, Junee integrated several of Omnisio's features into YouTube, including video annotations; in addition, he oversaw the implementation of RealTime, which lets users know what their friends are viewing.

Near the end of 2009, Junee left Google to start Inporia with Max Skibinsky, who sold Hive7 to Playdom in 2010. Inporia, an eCommerce fashion site that combines elements of social and gaming technology, has raised $1.25 million in seed funding from New Enterprise Associates, Ron Conway, Dave McClure, among others.

In 2013 Junee founded Wearable Intelligence with Yan-David Erlich and Chase Feiger, with a goal of bringing wearable technologies like Google Glass to enterprise markets.  In 2016 the company was renamed Parsable and raised an additional $20M in funding from investors including Schlumberger, Airbus and Saudi Aramco.

Reception
Junee has been profiled in the Sydney Morning Herald, Inc. Magazine, Smart Company, Virgin Inflight Magazine, and FHM. He was named Alumni of the Year by the University of Sydney, awarded with the 2012 G'day USA Australian Innovation Award in Silicon Valley, and received special recognition from the Pearcey Foundation. He is also an advisor at 500 Startups and Startmate.

References

External links
 

Living people
Australian businesspeople
University of Sydney alumni
Stanford University alumni
Businesspeople from the San Francisco Bay Area
1979 births